Jean Témerson (1898–1956) was a French actor.

Selected filmography

 The Lover of Madame Vidal (1936) - Guillaume - le domestique
 With a Smile (1936) - Cam (uncredited)
 Pépé le Moko (1937) - Gravère
 Blanchette (1937)
 Chaste Susanne (1937) - Firmin, le domestique
 La chaste Suzanne (1937) - Alexis
 Boulot aviateur (1937)
 The Messenger (1937) - Le maître d'hôtel (uncredited)
 The Alibi (1937) - Jojo, l'ami de Dany
 Le gagnant (1937)
 Les deux combinards (1938) - Ernest - le larbin
 Ramuntcho (1938) - Salaberry
 Barnabé (1938) - Firmin
 Alert in the Mediterranean (1938) - Le docteur Laurent
 La Piste du sud (1938) - Chailloux
 Éducation de prince (1938) - Hector, le valet de chambre
 Le révolté (1938) - Blotaque
 Prince de mon coeur (1938) - Tsoupoff - le chambellan
 The Chess Player (1938) - Stanislas, le roi de Pologne
 Captain Benoit (1938) - Tripoff, le touriste
 Quand le coeur chante (1938)
 Raphaël le tatoué (1939) - Monsieur Chromo
 Les gangsters du château d'If (1939) - Papalouche
 The Five Cents of Lavarede (1939) - Tartinovitch
 Mon oncle et mon curé (1939) - Le chauffeur
 Berlingot and Company (1939) - Donadieu - un homme aux idées bien arrêtées
 Monsieur Brotonneau (1939) - L'huissier
 Sacred Woods (1939) - L'huissier
 Personal Column (1939) - L'inspecteur Batol
 The Blue Danube (1940) - Alexander
 President Haudecoeur (1940) - Capet
 Monsieur Hector (1940) - Le Baron Grondin
 Volpone (1941) - Voltore
 Soyez les bienvenus (1942)
 The Misfortunes of Sophie (1946) - Le policier Moucheron
 Une femme coupée en morceaux (1946)
 That's Not the Way to Die (1946) - Le commissaire
 The Faceless Enemy (1946) - Hector / Le valet / Hector - the butler
 Rooster Heart (1946) - Stanislas Pugilaskoff
 Cargaison clandestine (1947)
 Si jeunesse savait... (1948) - Fred
 Une mort sans importance (1948) - Arthur / Arthur II
 The Cupboard Was Bare (1948) - Le deuxième habitué
 Fantomas Against Fantomas (1949) - Le président du consortium du marché noir
 Manon (1949) - Wikipedia Le portier du 'Magic'
 Miquette (1950) - Saint-Giron
 Dominique (1950)
 Here Is the Beauty (1950) - Théophile
 Without Trumpet or Drum (1950)
 The Atomic Monsieur Placido (1950) - Un maître d'hôtel
 Véronique (1950) - Me Corbin
 Blonde (1950) - Le valet
 Le gang des tractions-arrière (1950)
 Coq en pâte (1951)
 The Cape of Hope (1951) - Docteur Pagolos
 The Count of Monte Cristo (1954) - Le roi Louis XVIII (1)
 Queen Margot (1954) - Xavier Noblet
 Flesh and the Woman (1954) - L'aubergiste de 'La belle étoile'
 Les Diaboliques (1955) - Le garçon d'hôtel (final film role)

External links

1898 births
1956 deaths
French male film actors
Male actors from Paris
20th-century French male actors